Charity auctions are a way of raising funds for charities.

According to the New York Times, items that sell well in such auctions are experiential items that cannot typically be bought in the store, including meetings with celebrities, an autographed guitar, and naming rights for characters in a forthcoming novel. 
In one notable example, Musician Eric Clapton sold 100 of his guitars in a charity auction in 1999 and raised $5 million for his substance abuse treatment facility.

In a charity auction the winning payment benefits a cause that is presumably valued by the bidder as well as competing bidders. Thus, the bidder receives a benefit from his own payment – both the item won and the value the donation supports the organization – and other bidders do as well, as their charity is supported. 
Therefore, bidders have two objectives that could be in conflict with one another: to win items that they value but also to support a charitable cause in part by driving up the price. 

This makes the charity auction a public good, and that means that bidders may be incentivized to lose. This introduces a free-rider problem. If the free-rider problem dominates, then bids and consequently auction revenues would be depressed.
On the other hand, bids could rise because they are subsidized by charitable sentiment
Theoretical work has investigated the properties of different formats of charity auctions under the assumption that bidders care about the charity's revenue. The general result is that private benefits from charitable giving can translate into a “charity premium,” an increase I auction revenue resulting from charitable donations.

In particular, altruism could play a role, and this altruism could very much depend on the proportion of the proceeds that is donated to charity.

References

Charity events
Contexts for auctions